The 42nd Street station was an express station on the demolished IRT Second Avenue Line in Manhattan, New York City. It had three tracks and two island platforms. The next stop to the north was 50th Street for local trains and 57th Street for express trains. The next stop to the south was 34th Street for local trains and 14th Street for express trains. The station closed on June 13, 1942.

References

External links

IRT Second Avenue Line stations
Railway stations closed in 1942
Former elevated and subway stations in Manhattan